The Legend of Heroes, known in Japan as  is a series of role-playing video games developed by Nihon Falcom. First starting as a part of the Dragon Slayer series in the late 1980s, the series evolved into its own decade-spanning, interconnected series with fourteen entries, including several subseries. The most recent entry, The Legend of Heroes: Kuro no Kiseki II – Crimson Sin, was released in 2022.

History
The series was created by Nihon Falcom. It began with the release of Dragon Slayer: The Legend of Heroes in 1989 as a part of  Dragon Slayer franchise. It was released for various computer platforms, as well as consoles such as the Sega Genesis, Super NES, and the TurboGrafx-16. The latter would be the first and last game in the series released in English until 2005. In Japan however, the series continued with Dragon Slayer: The Legend of Heroes II, released in 1992 for a similar selection of platforms.

The third game in the series, The Legend of Heroes III (1994), later released in English as The Legend of Heroes II: Prophecy of the Moonlight Witch, dropped "Dragon Slayer" from the title. It would be followed up by The Legend of Heroes IV (1996) and The Legend of Heroes V (1999), later known outside of Japan as respectively The Legend of Heroes: A Tear of Vermillion and The Legend of Heroes III: Song of the Ocean. The three games form the "Gagharv trilogy", a subseries following a shared narrative within the same world.

After the conclusion of the Gagharv trilogy, Falcom introduced a completely new world and story with their next game: The Legend of Heroes VI: Trails in the Sky (2004). The game, later dropping the VI from the title, received two sequels: Trails in the Sky SC (2006) and Trails in the Sky the 3rd (2007). Trails would end up becoming a major success for Falcom, with every Legend of Heroes game released since being a part of it.

The next two games in the series, The Legend of Heroes: Trails from Zero (2010) and Trails to Azure (2011), form the "Crossbell" arc of the Trails narrative. The Trails of Cold Steel arc would follow, starting with The Legend of Heroes: Trails of Cold Steel in 2013 and ending with Trails of Cold Steel IV in 2018. The Legend of Heroes: Trails into Reverie is usually grouped into this arc. The ongoing arc, Kuro no Kiseki, started with the release of The Legend of Heroes: Kuro no Kiseki in 2021.

Manga and anime
A Dragon Slayer: The Legend of Heroes original video animation anime was released in 1992, the same year that Dragon Slayer: The Legend of Heroes II was released, loosely based on the story of the first game. In 1997, it was dubbed into English by Urban Vision and was released onto VHS in North America.

In 2009, three volumes of a Trails in the Sky manga were published in Japan by Kadokawa Shoten, which was followed next year by a sequel, Trails from Zero: Pre-Story, published by ASCII Media Works. Two original video animation anime episodes of Trails in the Sky were respectively released in October 2011 and January 2012. The Legend of Heroes: Trails of Cold Steel – Northern War, an anime television series by Tatsunoko Production and set in the Trails universe, began airing in January 2023.

Notes

References

External links
  

 
Role-playing video games
Video game franchises introduced in 1989